There are over two hundred scheduled monuments in Cheshire, a county in North West England, which date from the Neolithic period to the middle of the 20th century.  This list includes the scheduled monuments in Cheshire between the years 1066 and 1539, the period accepted by Revealing Cheshire's Past as the medieval period.

A scheduled monument is a nationally important archaeological site or monument which is given legal protection by being placed on a list (or "schedule") by the Secretary of State for Culture, Media and Sport; English Heritage takes the leading role in identifying such sites.  The current legislation supporting this is the Ancient Monuments and Archaeological Areas Act 1979.  The term "monument" can apply to the whole range of archaeological sites, and they are not always visible above ground. Such sites have to have been deliberately constructed by human activity.  They range from prehistoric standing stones and burial sites, through Roman remains and medieval structures such as castles and monasteries, to later structures such as industrial sites and buildings constructed for the World Wars or the Cold War.

At least 129 scheduled monuments, over half of the total in Cheshire, date from the medieval period.  The most frequently found monuments are moats or moated sites, of which there are 55.  These are followed by the remains of crosses, 15 of which are churchyard crosses and 11 are wayside crosses, and the remains of 12 castles.  There are seven deserted villages, three boundary stones, and the remains of three abbeys, two holy wells, and two halls.  There are individual remains of a lime kiln, a pottery kiln, a hospital, a former chapel, a monastic grange, a tomb, an ice house and a hunting lodge.  Chester city walls, the Dee Bridge and Farndon Bridge are scheduled monuments which are largely intact and continue in use today.

During the medieval period, houses were built on moated sites partly for defensive purposes but also as a sign of prestige.  Cheshire contains over 200 moated sites out of more than 6,000 in England.  Crosses in churchyards were used for a variety of purposes, including sites for prayer and pilgrimage, and for public proclamations.  Many of them were destroyed following the Reformation and some were converted into sundials by Catholic recusants to prevent their destruction.  Other standing stones were part of wayside crosses acting as guides to local abbeys, or plague stones which were used for the transfer of money and items during periods of plague.  Motte and bailey castles were introduced to Britain by the Normans and were used in Cheshire to defend its agricultural resources.  In many cases the monuments consist only of earthworks or foundations, and where significant structural remains are present, they are often also listed buildings.

See also

List of scheduled monuments in Cheshire dated to before 1066
List of scheduled monuments in Cheshire since 1539
Grade I listed buildings in Cheshire

References

 
 
Scheduled
Cheshire